Estafa de amor (English title:Love Scam) is a Mexican telenovela produced by Ernesto Alonso and transmitted by Telesistema Mexicano.

Amparo Rivelles and Raúl Ramírez starred as protagonists.

Cast 
Amparo Rivelles
Raúl Ramírez
Carmen Montejo
Prudencia Grifell
Carlos Nieto
Karina Laverde
María Antonieta de las Nieves

References 

Mexican telenovelas
1961 telenovelas
Televisa telenovelas
1961 Mexican television series debuts
1961 Mexican television series endings
Spanish-language telenovelas